Glastaria is a monotypic genus of flowering plants belonging to the family Brassicaceae. It only contains one species, Glastaria glastifolia (DC.) Kuntze 

Its native range is south eastern Turkey to northern Iraq. It is found in Iraq, Lebanon-Syria, Palestine and Turkey.

It was first described and published in Ann. Sci. Nat., Bot., sér. 2, Vol.16 on page 382 in 1841.

References

Brassicaceae
Brassicaceae genera
Flora of Western Asia